Andi Hadroj (born 22 February 1999) is an Albanian footballer who plays for Partizani in the Kategoria Superiore.

He is the winner of Albanian First Division 2018–2019.

Career

Laçi
Hadroj began his senior career with Laçi in the Albanian Superliga, making his debut for the club on 12 July 2018 in a 2–1 away defeat to  Anorthosis. He also appeared in the return leg of the two-legged fixture as Laçi bowed out of the Europa League. A month later, he made his domestic debut in the club's 3–2 defeat to Skënderbeu during the 2018 Albanian Supercup. He would make just eleven appearances in all competitions in his first and only season with the club.

Bylis
In January 2019, Hadroj moved to then-Kategoria e Parë club Bylis on a free transfer. He made his debut for the club the following month, playing the entirety of a 1–0 league victory over Oriku.

Career statistics

Club

References

External links
Profile at ESPN FC

1999 births
Living people
People from Pukë
Association football defenders
Albanian footballers
KF Laçi players
KF Bylis Ballsh players
Kategoria Superiore players
Kategoria e Parë players
Albania international footballers